4-ANPP, also known as 4-anilino-N-phenethylpiperidine (4-ANPP), 4-aminophenyl-1-phenethylpiperidine, or despropionyl fentanyl, is a direct precursor to fentanyl and some fentanyl analogues such as acetylfentanyl. It is commonly found as a contaminant in samples of drugs containing fentanyl, which may include samples represented by the supplier as heroin or other opioids. It is not psychoactive and is present only as a result of improper processing of the intended product of the synthesis.

Preparation
4-ANPP can be prepared from N-phenethyl-4-piperidinone (NPP) and aniline, then being reduced.

4-ANPP can also be prepared using 4-anilinopiperidine and selectively adding the phenethyl group.

Uses
4-ANPP is useful in the synthesis of pharmaceuticals, primarily fentanyl and its analogs. Paul Janssen (founder of Janssen Pharmaceutica) first synthesized fentanyl in 1960 using a similar method, with Benzylfentanyl as an intermediate. The following synthesis, developed by an individual under the pseudonym of Seigfried, involves the reductive amination of N-phenethyl-4-piperidinone (NPP) to 4-ANPP.  This product is reacted with propionyl chloride to form fentanyl.

References

Piperidines
Phenethylamines
Janssen Pharmaceutica